Mario Catania (born 5 March 1952) served as the Italian minister of agriculture under Prime Minister Mario Monti from November 2011 to 28 April 2013.

Biography
Mario Catania was born on 5 March 1952 in Rome.

He was the head of department of European and international policies at the agriculture ministry. He was also part of the Italian Permanent Delegation to the EU in Brussels. In November 2011, he was appointed agriculture minister. He replaced Francesco Saverio Romano in the post.

In 2012, Catania joined Union of the Centre (UdC) and was elected deputy, on With Monti for Italy coalition's lists. Catania's term as agriculture minister ended on 28 April 2013 and Nunzia De Girolamo succeeded him in the post.

References

1952 births
Living people
Agriculture ministers of Italy
Sapienza University of Rome alumni
Politicians from Rome
Union of the Centre (2002) politicians
Civic Choice politicians
Democratic Centre (Italy) politicians